The 2016 season was St. Patrick's Athletic F.C.'s 87th year in existence and was the Supersaint's 65th consecutive season in the top-flight of Irish football. It was the fifth year that Liam Buckley was the team's manager (in his current spell), following replacing Pete Mahon in December 2011. The league season was poor from the Saints, finishing 7th, meaning they would be without European football next season for the first time since 2010. They did however knock Jeunesse Esch out of the Europa League before being narrowly knocked out by Dinamo Minsk of Belarus. They also retained their League Cup crown by winning the 2016 League of Ireland Cup by beating Limerick 4–1 at the Markets Field on 17 September 2016.

Squad

Transfers

Preseason

In

Out

Mid-season

In

Out

Squad statistics

Appearances, goals and cards
Number in brackets represents (appearances of which were substituted ON).
Last Updated – 29 October 2016

Top scorers
Includes all competitive matches.
Last updated 29 October 2016

Top assists
Includes all competitive matches.
Last updated 29 October 2016

Top Clean Sheets
Includes all competitive matches.
Last updated 29 October 2016

Disciplinary record

Captains

Club

Technical Staff
Manager: Liam Buckley
Assistant manager: Richie Smith
Head Of Player Recruitment / Coach: Dave Campbell
Coach: Darius Kierans
Goalkeeping coach: Pat Jennings
Strength and Conditioning Coach: Paul Stewart
Video Analyst: Jason Donohue
Coaches Assistant: Graeme Buckley
Chartered Physiotherapist: Fionn Daly
Physiotherapist: Christy O'Neill
Club Doctor: Dr Matt Corcoran
Kit Man: Derek Haines
Equipment Manager: Gerry Molloy
Under 19's Management: Gareth Dodrill
Under 17's Management: Jamie Moore

Kit

|
|
|
|
|
|
|
|}

The club released a new Home kit and Third kit for the season, with the Away kit being retained from the 2015 season.

Key:
LOI=League of Ireland
FAI=FAI Cup
EAC= EA Sports Cup
UEL=Europa League
LSC=Leinster Senior Cup
PRC=President's Cup
FRN=Friendly

Competitions

League of Ireland

League table

Results summary

Results by round

Matches

FAI Cup

EA Sports Cup

Europa League

First qualifying round 

St Patrick's Athletic won on away goals.

Second qualifying round

Leinster Senior Cup

Friendlies

Preseason

References

2016
2016 League of Ireland Premier Division by club